Presbycusis (also spelled presbyacusis, from Greek πρέσβυς presbys "old" + ἄκουσις akousis "hearing"), or age-related hearing loss, is the cumulative effect of aging on hearing. It is a progressive and irreversible bilateral symmetrical age-related sensorineural hearing loss resulting from degeneration of the cochlea or associated structures of the inner ear or auditory nerves. The hearing loss is most marked at higher frequencies. Hearing loss that accumulates with age but is caused by factors other than normal aging (nosocusis and sociocusis) is not presbycusis, although differentiating the individual effects of distinct causes of hearing loss can be difficult.

The cause of presbycusis is a combination of genetics, cumulative environmental exposures and pathophysiological changes related to aging. At present there are no preventive measures known; treatment is by hearing aid or surgical implant.

Presbycusis is the most common cause of hearing loss, affecting one out of three persons by age 65, and one out of two by age 75. Presbycusis is the second most common illness next to arthritis in aged people.

Many vertebrates such as fish, birds and amphibians do not experience presbycusis in old age as they are able to regenerate their cochlear sensory cells, whereas mammals including humans have genetically lost this regenerative ability.

Presentation

Primary symptoms:
sounds or speech becoming dull, muffled or attenuated
need for increased volume on television, radio, music and other audio sources
difficulty using the telephone
loss of directionality of sound
difficulty understanding speech, especially women and children
difficulty in speech discrimination against background noise (cocktail party effect)
Secondary symptoms:
hyperacusis, heightened sensitivity to certain volumes and frequencies of sound, resulting from "recruitment"
tinnitus, ringing, buzzing, hissing or other sounds in the ear when no external sound is present
Usually occurs after age 50, but deterioration in hearing has been found to start very early, from about the age of 18 years. The ISO standard 7029 shows expected threshold changes due purely to age for carefully screened populations (i.e. excluding those with ear disease, noise exposure etc.), based on a meta-analysis of published data. Age affects high frequencies more than low, and men more than women. One early consequence is that even young adults may lose the ability to hear very high frequency tones above 15 or 16 kHz. Despite this, age-related hearing loss may only become noticeable later in life. The effects of age can be exacerbated by exposure to environmental noise, whether at work or in leisure time (shooting, music, etc.). This is noise-induced hearing loss (NIHL) and is distinct from presbycusis. A second exacerbating factor is exposure to ototoxic drugs and chemicals.

Over time, the detection of high-pitched sounds becomes more difficult, and speech perception is affected, particularly of sibilants and fricatives. Patients typically express a decreased ability to understand speech. Once the loss has progressed to the 2–4 kHz range, there is increased difficulty understanding consonants. Both ears tend to be affected. The impact of presbycusis on communication depends on both the severity of the condition and the communication partner.

Older adults with presbycusis often exhibit associated symptoms of social isolation, depression, anxiety, frailty and cognitive decline.
The risk of having cognitive impairment increased 7 percent for every 10 dB of hearing loss at baseline. No effect of hearing aids was seen in the Lin Baltimore study.

Causes

The aging process has three distinct components: physiologic degeneration, extrinsic damage (nosocusis), and intrinsic damage (sociocusis). These factors are superimposed on a genetic substrate, and may be overshadowed by general age-related susceptibility to diseases and disorders.

Hearing loss is only weakly correlated with age. In preindustrial and non-industrial societies, persons retain their hearing into old age. In the Framingham cohort study, only 10% of the variability of hearing with age could be explained by age-related physiologic deterioration.  Within family groups, heredity factors were dominant; across family groups, other, presumably sociocusis and nosocusis factors were dominant.

 Heredity: factors like early aging of the cochlea and susceptibility of the cochlea for drug insults are genetically determined.
 Oxidative stress
 General inflammatory conditions

Sociocusis
Sociocusis is the condition of those who have hearing loss attributed to continuous noise exposures, unrelated to their job or occupation. This exposure to these stimuli is frequent, and are often considered common "background noises" that affect the hearing abilities of individuals. Examples of sociocusis-related stimuli are the continuous noises from traffic, home appliances, music, television, and radio. The accumulated exposure to these noises over many years can lead to a condition similar to pure presbycusis.

Nosocusis
Nosocusis factors are those that can cause hearing loss, which are not noise-based and separate from pure presbycusis. They may include:
 Ototoxic drugs: Ingestion of ototoxic drugs like aspirin may hasten the process of presbycusis.
 vascular degeneration
 Atherosclerosis: May diminish vascularity of the cochlea, thereby reducing its oxygen supply.
 Dietary habits: Increased intake of saturated fat may accelerate atherosclerotic changes in old age.
 Smoking: Is postulated to accentuate atherosclerotic changes in blood vessels aggravating presbycusis.
 Diabetes: May cause vasculitis and endothelial proliferation in the blood vessels of the cochlea, thereby reducing its blood supply.
 Hypertension: causes potent vascular changes, like reduction in blood supply to the cochlea, thereby aggravating presbycusis.

However, a recent study found that diabetes, atherosclerosis and hypertension had no correlation to presbycusis, suggesting that these are nosocusis (acquired hearing loss) factors, not intrinsic factors.

Pathophysiology

There are four pathological phenotypes of presbycusis:
 Sensory: characterised by degeneration of the organ of Corti, the sensory organ for hearing. Located within the scala media, it contains inner and outer hair cells with stereocilia. The outer hair cells play a significant role in the amplification of sound. Age-related hair cell degeneration is characterized by loss of stereocilia, shrinkage of hair cell soma, and reduction in outer hair cell mechanical properties, suggesting that functional decline in mechanotransduction and cochlear amplification precedes hair cell loss and contributes to age-related hearing loss.  At the molecular level, hair cell aging is associated with key molecular processes, including transcriptional regulation, DNA damage/repair, autophagy, and inflammatory response, as well as those related to hair cell unique morphology and function.

 Neural: characterised by degeneration of cells of the spiral ganglion.

 Strial/metabolic: characterised by atrophy of stria vascularis in all turns of cochlea. Located in the lateral wall of the cochlea, the stria vascularis contains sodium-potassium-ATPase pumps that are responsible for producing the endolymph resting potential. As individuals age, a loss of capillaries leads to the endolymphatic potential becoming harder to maintain, which brings a decrease in cochlear potential.

 Cochlear conductive: due to stiffening of the basilar membrane thus affecting its movement.  This type of pathology has not been verified as contributing to presbycusis.

In addition there are two other types:
 Mixed
 Indeterminate

The shape of the audiogram categorizes abrupt high-frequency loss (sensory phenotype) or flat loss (strial phenotype).

The mainstay of SNHL is strial, with only about 5% of cases being sensory. This type of presbycusis is manifested by a low-frequency hearing loss, with unimpaired speech recognition.

Classically, audiograms in neural presbycusis show a moderate downward slope into higher frequencies with a gradual worsening over time. A severe loss in speech discrimination is often described, out of proportion to the threshold loss, making amplification difficult due to poor comprehension.

The audiogram associated with sensory presbycusis is thought to show a sharply sloping high-frequency loss extending beyond the speech frequency range, and clinical evaluation reveals a slow, symmetric, and bilateral progression of hearing loss.

Diagnosis
Hearing loss is classified as mild, moderate, severe or profound. Pure-tone audiometry for air conduction thresholds at 250, 500, 1000, 2000, 4000, 6000 and 8000 Hz is traditionally used to classify the degree of hearing loss in each ear.  Normal hearing thresholds are considered to be 25 dB sensitivity, though it has been proposed that this threshold is too high, and that 15 dB (about half as loud) is more typical.  Mild hearing loss is thresholds of 25–45 dB; moderate hearing loss is thresholds of 45–65 dB; severe hearing loss is thresholds of 65–85 dB; and profound hearing loss thresholds are greater than 85 dB.

Tinnitus occurring in only one ear should prompt the clinician to initiate further evaluation for other etiologies. In addition, the presence of a pulse-synchronous rushing sound may require additional imaging to exclude vascular disorders.

Otoscopy

An examination of the external ear canal and tympanic membrane performed by a medical doctor, otolaryngologist, or audiologist using an otoscope, a visual instrument inserted into the ear. This also allows some inspection of the middle ear through the translucent tympanic membrane.

Tympanometry

A test administered by a medical doctor, otolaryngologist or audiologist of the tympanic membrane and middle ear function using a tympanometer, an air-pressure/sound wave instrument inserted into the ear canal.  The result is a tympanogram showing ear canal volume, middle ear pressure and eardrum compliance. Normal middle ear function (Type A tympanogram) with a hearing loss may suggest presbycusis. Type B and Type C tympanograms indicate an abnormality inside the ear and therefore may have an additional effect on the hearing.

Laboratory studies
This may include a blood or other sera test for inflammatory markers such as those for autoinflammatory diseases.

Audiometry

A hearing test administered by a medical doctor, otolaryngologist (ENT) or audiologist including pure tone audiometry and speech recognition may be used to determine the extent and nature of hearing loss, and distinguish presbycusis from other kinds of hearing loss. Otoacoustic emissions and evoked response testing may be used to test for audio neuropathy. The diagnosis of a sensorineural pattern hearing loss is made through audiometry, which shows a significant hearing loss without the "air-bone gap" that is characteristic of conductive hearing disturbances. In other words, air conduction is equal to bone conduction. Persons with cochlear deficits fail otoacoustic emissions testing, while persons with 8th cranial nerve (vestibulocochlear nerve) deficits fail auditory brainstem response testing.

Presbycusis audiogram

Magnetic resonance imaging (MRI)

As part of differential diagnosis, an MRI scan may be done to check for vascular anomalies, tumors, and structural problems like enlarged mastoids. MRI and other types of scan cannot directly detect or measure age-related hearing loss.

Treatment

At present, presbycusis, being primarily sensorineural in nature, cannot be prevented, ameliorated or cured.  Treatment options fall into three categories: pharmacological, surgical and management.

There are no approved or recommended pharmaceutical treatments for presbycusis.

Cochlear implant
In cases of severe or profound hearing loss, a surgical cochlear implant is possible. This is an electronic device that replaces the cochlea of the inner ear.  Electrodes are typically inserted through the round window of the cochlea, into the fluid-filled scala tympani. They stimulate the peripheral axons of the primary auditory neurons, which then send information to the brain via the auditory nerve. The cochlea is tonotopically mapped in a spiral fashion, with lower frequencies localizing at the apex of the cochlea, and high frequencies at the base of the cochlea, near the oval and round windows. With age, comes a loss in distinction of frequencies, especially higher ones. The electrodes of the implant are designed to stimulate the array of nerve fibers that previously responded to different frequencies accurately. Due to spatial constraints, the cochlear implant may not be inserted all the way into the cochlear apex. It provides a different kind of sound spectrum than natural hearing, but may enable the recipient to recognize speech and environmental sounds.

Middle ear implants
These are surgically implanted hearing aids inserted onto the middle ear. These aids work by directly vibrating the ossicles, and are cosmetically favorable due to their hidden nature.

Management
Hearing aids help improve hearing of many elderly.  Hearing aids can now be tuned to specific frequency ranges of hearing loss.
Aural rehabilitation for the affected person and their communication partners may reduce the impact on communication. Techniques such as squarely facing the affected person, enunciating, ensuring adequate light, minimizing noise in the environment, and using contextual cues are used to improve comprehension.

Research

Pharmaceuticals
Pharmacological treatment options are limited, and remain clinically unproven. Among these are the water-soluble coenzyme Q10 formulation, the prescription drug Tanakan, and combination antioxidant therapy.

In a study performed in 2010, it was found that the water-soluble formulation of coenzyme Q10 (CoQ10) caused a significant improvement in liminar tonal audiometry of the air and bone thresholds at 1000 Hz, 2000 Hz, 4000 Hz, and 8000 Hz.
Antioxidant therapy – age-related hearing loss was reduced in animal models with a combination agent comprising six antioxidant agents that target four sites within the oxidative pathway: L-cysteine-glutathione mixed disulfide, ribose-cysteine, NW-nitro-L-arginine methyl ester, vitamin B12, folate, and ascorbic acid. It is thought that these supplements attenuate the decline of cochlear structure due to prolonged oxidative stress. However, more recent studies have had conflicting results. In 2012, a study was done with CBA/J female mice. They were placed on an antioxidant-rich diet for 24 months consisting of vitamins A, C, E, L-carnitine, and α-lipoic acid. While this increased the inner ear's antioxidant capacity, the actual hearing loss was unaffected. Therefore, in this study, antioxidants were shown not to improve presbycusis mechanisms.
The effects of the pharmaceutical drug Tanakan were observed when treating tympanophonia in elderly women. Tanakan was found to decrease the intensity of tympanitis and improve speech and hearing in aged patients, giving rise to the idea of recommending treatment with it to elderly patients with presbycusis or normal tonal hearing.
AM-111, an otoprotective peptide, was shown in a chinchilla study to rescue and protect against hearing loss following impulse noise trauma. AM-111 acts as a cell-permeable inhibitor of JNK-mediated apoptosis. IP injections or local injections into membrane of the round window were given, and permanent threshold shifts (PTS) were measured three weeks after impulse noise exposure. AM-111 animals had significantly lower PTS, implicating AM-111 as a possible protective agent against JNK-mediated cochlear cell death and against permanent hearing deficits after noise trauma. 
The anti-inflammatory, anti-oxidant substance Ebselen was observed to reduce hearing loss in a study done in 2007. It has been previously shown that noise trauma correlates with decreases in glutathione peroxidase (GPx) activity, which has been linked to loss of the outer hair cells. GPx1, an isoform of GPx, is predominantly expressed in stria vascularis, cochlea, spiral ligament, organ of Corti, and spiral ganglion cells. The stria vascularis displayed significant decreases in GPx1 immunoreactivity and increased swelling following noise exposure in rats. There was also significant outer hair cell loss in the cochlea within five hours of noise exposure. Administration of Ebselen before and after the noise stimulus reduced stria vascularis swelling as well as cochlear outer hair cell loss. This implicates Ebselen as a supplement for GPx1 in the outer hair cell degradation mechanism of hearing loss. This treatment is currently in active clinical trials.
A γ-secretase inhibitor of Notch signaling was shown to induce new hair cells and partially recover hearing loss. Auditory hair cell loss is permanent damage due to the inability of these cells to regenerate. Therefore, deafness due to this pathology is viewed as irreversible. Hair cell development is mediated by Notch signaling, which exerts lateral inhibition onto hair cells. Notch signaling in supporting hair cells leads to prevention of differentiation in surrounding hair cells. After identifying a potent γ-secretase inhibitor selective for stimulating differentiation in inner ear stem cells, it was administered in acoustically injured mice. The animals who received the injury and treatment displayed an increased hair cell number and stimulated hearing recovery. This suggests that γ-secretase inhibition of Notch signaling can be a potential pharmacological therapy in approaching what was previously viewed as permeant deafness.

Stem cell therapy
A fetal thymus graft, or rejuvenation of the recipient immunity by inoculation of young CD4+ T cells, also prevents presbycusis as well as up-regulation of the interleukin 1 receptor type II gene (IL1R2) in CD4+ T cells and degeneration of the spiral ganglion in Samp1 mice, a murine model of human senescence. This technology remains years or even decades away from human application.

Popular culture

Abilities of young people to hear high frequency tones inaudible to those over 25 or so has led to the development of technologies to disperse groups of young people around shops (The Mosquito), and development of a cell phone ringtone, Teen Buzz, for students to use in school, that older people cannot hear. In September 2006 this technique was used to make a dance track called 'Buzzin'. The track had two melodies, one that everyone could hear and one that only younger people could hear.

Animals
Many vertebrates such as fish, birds and amphibians do not experience presbycusis in old age as they are able to regenerate their cochlear sensory cells, whereas mammals including humans have genetically lost this ability. A number of laboratories worldwide are conducting comparative studies of birds and mammals that aim to find the differences in regenerative capacity, with a view to developing new treatments for human hearing problems.

See also 
 Presbyopia – age-related degeneration of the eyes

References

External links 

Deafness
Geriatrics
Audiology
Hearing loss